The Women's National Soccer League (WNSL) was Australia's top women's association football league. Originally known as the Ansett Australia Summer Series for sponsorship reasons, the WNSL began in 1996 consisting of six clubs and continued through until 2004, folding alongside the National Soccer League. It was not until 2008 that a women's top flight league was re-established in Australia, named the W-League, as of the 2021–22 season renamed A-League Women.

Clubs

 In 2004 Western Waves was given temporary entry to the WNSL for six games

Champions
Champions are:

Individual honours

Julie Dolan Medal

The medal is awarded annually to the player voted to be the best player in the Women's Football League in Australia, named after former Matildas Captain and football administrator Julie Dolan. The award was for the best player in the WNSL, and is currently maintained in the successor competition, the W-League. The following table contains only those winners of the medal who won it during the WNSL era.

Golden Boot

WNSL Rising Star Award

See also

 W-League (Australia) – Current Australian women's national league
 Women's soccer in Australia 
 Geography of women's association football

References

External links
WNSL Statistics on OzFootball
Back of the Net
Football Australia
Australian Soccer

National
Women
Women